1937–38 was the 38th season of competitive football in Belgium. The Belgium national football team qualified for the 1938 FIFA World Cup, for the 3rd consecutive year but lost in the first round to the organising country, France (1-3). R Beerschot AC won their 6th Premier Division title.

Overview
The national team qualified for the 1938 FIFA World Cup by beating Luxembourg and drawing with the Netherlands. They lost in the round of 16 in the World Cup finals against France.

At the end of the season, TSV Lyra and RC Tirlemont were relegated to Division I, while Boom FC (Division I A winner) and RCS Brugeois (Division I B winner) were promoted to the Premier Division.
RFC Montegnée, FC Duffel, RRC de Gand and VG Ostende were relegated from Division I to Promotion, to be replaced by CS Visétois, REFC Hasselt, RRC de Bruxelles and AS Ostende.

National team

* Belgium score given first

Key
 H = Home match
 A = Away match
 N = On neutral ground
 F = Friendly
 WCQ = World Cup qualification
 WCFR = World Cup first round
 o.g. = own goal

Honours

Final league tables

Premier Division

References
RSSSF archive – Final tables 1895–2002
Belgian clubs history
FA website